Zhangixalus viridis (Okinawan tree frog) is a species of frog in the family Rhacophoridae.  It is endemic to Ryukyu Islands, Japan. It is known from Amamioshima, Kakeromajima, Ukejima, Yoronjima and Tokunoshima islands of the Amami Group, and Okinawajima, Iheyajima and Kumejima islands of the Okinawa Group.

Two subspecies are distinguished: Okinawa green tree frog (Zhangixalus viridis viridis) of the Okinawa Group and Amami green tree frog (Zhangixalus viridis amamiensis) of the Amami Group.

Zhangixalus viridis is no longer present on Yoronjima island. Its disappearance from the island some time after 1958 is attributed to habitat change (conversion of paddy fields to drier habitats) and an introduced predator, Japanese weasel (Mustela itatsi). This is the first island-level extinction of a native amphibian in the Ryukyu Archipelago during modern times.

Zhangixalus viridis is a moderate-sized rhacophorid frog (snout-vent length ). It is a common species in forests close to paddy fields and wetlands. It breeds in wetlands and paddy fields by larval development.

References

Viridis
Endemic amphibians of Japan
Taxonomy articles created by Polbot
Amphibians described in 1861